Magli Elster (née Raknes; 21 November 1912 – 11 May 1993) was a Norwegian psychoanalyst, literary critic, poet and translator.

Personal life 
Elster was born in the neighborhood of Vålerenga in Kristiania (now Oslo), Norway. She was the daughter of psychologist Ola Raknes (1887–1975) and poet-playwright Aslaug Vaa (1889–1965). She grew up partly in Vålerenga, Kviteseid and Paris. She was married to writer and Director-General of the NRK Torolf Elster (1911–2006)  and was the mother of philosopher Jon Elster.

Career 
Elster received psychoanalytic training in Prague from 1934 to 1937, and practiced as psychoanalyst from 1937 to 1943. From 1947 to 1985 she was assigned as literary critic for the newspaper Arbeiderbladet. She made her literary debut in 1952 with the poetry collection Trikken går i engen, and her literary breakthrough was the collection Med hilsen fra natten from 1953. Further collections are Den syngende flåten from 1955, En pike av tre (1959) and Sekundene (1971). She chaired the association Norsk Litteraturkritikerlag from 1959 to 1969. She was a co-founder of the Association Internationale de Critiques Litteraires. In 1986 she and her husband Torolf were awarded the Fritt Ord Award.

References

1912 births
1993 deaths
Writers from Oslo
20th-century Norwegian poets
Norwegian literary critics
Women literary critics
Norwegian women critics
Norwegian women non-fiction writers
Norwegian psychoanalysts
20th-century Norwegian translators
Norwegian women poets
20th-century Norwegian women writers